Hot Pants can refer to:
Hotpants or hot pants, an item of clothing
"Hot Pants" (James Brown song)
"Hot Pants" (Gene Summers song)
Hot Pants Patrol, a promotional group for the Philadelphia Phillies
Hot Pants (band), a French band formed by singer Manu Chao prior to the establishment of Mano Negra
 Hot Pants (album)
Hot Pants, a side character in Hirohiko Araki's manga series Steel Ball Run